Larry Jones may refer to:

 Larry Jones (American football coach) (1933–2013), college football coach
 Larry Jones (Boston University), American former basketball player
 Larry Jones (basketball) (born 1942), basketball player
 Larry Jones (wide receiver) (born 1951), American football player
 Chipper Jones (Larry Wayne Jones, Jr., born 1972), American baseball player
 J. Larry Jones (born 1956), American racehorse trainer
 Zeke Jones (Larry Jones, born 1966), American Olympic wrestler
 Larry Jones (humanist), chemist
 Founder and former president of Feed the Children, charity organization

See also
Lawrence Jones (disambiguation)